Virginia's 31st House of Delegates district elects one of 100 seats in the Virginia House of Delegates, the lower house of the state's bicameral legislature. District 31 contains portions of Prince William County and Fauquier County. Since 2018, Elizabeth Guzmán has represented the district.

District officeholders

See also
Virginia's 31st House of Delegates district election, 2001
2011 Virginia's 31st House of Delegates district election

References 

Virginia House of Delegates districts
Prince William County, Virginia
Fauquier County, Virginia